Krishnāji Gopāl Karve (1887 – 19 April 1910) was an Indian freedom fighter, a revolutionary. He had completed his B.A.(Hons) and had taken admission to LLB in Mumbai University.
He was a member of the Abhinav Bharat Society in Nashik. On 21 December 1909, he along with Anant Laxman Kanhere and Vinayak Narayan Deshpande shot Jackson, the Collector of Nashik. He was sentenced to death in the Bombay high court and hanged in Thane Jail on 19 April 1910.

References

1910 deaths
1887 births
Indian independence activists from Maharashtra